Man of the House (simplified Chinese: 男人当家) is a Singaporean Chinese modern family drama broadcast on Malaysia's free-to-air channel NTV7. It made its debut on 3 May 2007.

Plot
Shengli seems to have led a perfect and diligent life and retires from his job only to discover his wife is determined to divorce him and all his sons are facing relationship problems of their own. It is now up to the men to straighten things out.

Cast and characters
 Li Wenhai as Zhen Shengli
 Jess Teong as Zhou Huijing
 Wang Yuqing as Li Hongru
 Vincent Ng as Zhen Jianyi
 Janelle Chin as Wang Shuxian
 Lynn Lim as Fang Wen
 Alan Tern as Zhen Jian'er
 Phyllis Sim as Li Lizhen
 Tiffany Leong as Joe
 Coby Chong as Zhen Jiansan
 Eelyn Kok as Tan Yimin

References

External links
 English Edition

Singapore Chinese dramas
Chinese-language drama television series in Malaysia
Singapore–Malaysia television co-productions
2007 Singaporean television series debuts
NTV7 original programming
Channel 8 (Singapore) original programming